Paula Hawkins (née Fickes; January 24, 1927 – December 4, 2009) was an American politician from Florida. She is the only woman elected to the U.S. Senate from Florida. She was the second woman ever elected to the Senate from the American South. She was the first woman in the country to be elected to a full Senate term without having a close family member who previously served in major public office.

Early years
Hawkins was the eldest of three children born to Paul and Leone Fickes in Salt Lake City, Utah. Her father was a Naval Chief Warrant Officer. In 1934, the family moved to Atlanta, Georgia, where her father taught at Georgia Tech. Her parents split when Paula was in high school, and Leone and the children returned to Utah. She finished high school at Richmond, Utah in 1944, then enrolled at Utah State University. Paula was hired to be the Athletic director's secretary and met her future husband. On September 5, 1947, Paula Fickes and Walter Eugene Hawkins were married and moved to Atlanta. Gene earned a degree in electrical engineering and eventually opened his own business. The couple had three children before moving in 1955 to Winter Park, Florida, where Paula became a community activist and Republican volunteer.

Politics

She began her electoral career by campaigning as a consumer advocate.  She became the first woman elected to statewide office in Florida by winning a seat on the Florida Public Service Commission in 1972.  Hawkins was an unsuccessful candidate for the Republican nomination for the U.S. Senate in 1974, which was won by Jack Eckerd. She was reelected to the Public Services Commission in 1976.  In 1978, she was the Republican candidate for Lieutenant Governor on the ticket headed by Jack Eckerd. They lost to State Sen. Bob Graham and State Rep. Wayne Mixson.  In 1980, she was elected to the United States Senate representing Florida, becoming Florida's first woman elected to the United States Senate and the fifth from the South.

U.S. Senate
In 1980, she defeated former Congressman Bill Gunter to win election to the United States Senate; she was Florida's first woman elected to the United States Senate and only the fifth from the South.

She was the first woman senator to bring her husband to Washington, D.C. As a result, the Senate Wives' Club became known as the Senate Spouses' Club.  She took office two days early because of the resignation of Senator Stone, which allowed her to gain a seniority advantage over the other freshmen senators.

Hawkins was particularly active in the realm of child welfare. She was a key figure in advocating and passing the 1982 Missing Children's Act, and in 1983 chaired the Investigation and Oversight Subcommittee of the Senate Labor and Human Resources Committee, where she launched an investigation of the increase of children reported missing. In 1984 she spoke at the Third National Conference on Sexual Victimization of Children, where she stunned listeners by disclosing that she herself had been the victim of sexual abuse as a child. She subsequently authored, Children at Risk, My Fight Against Child Abuse: A Personal Story and a Public Plea, which was published in 1986.

In 1984, she was co-chairwoman of the platform committee at the RNC.

Senator Hawkins, in 1985, participated in the Record Label Hearings of the Senate's Commerce Committee, where the issue of labeling musical songs was examined, after the Parents Music Resource Center initiative. During the hearings, Hawkins had a notable altercation with testifying musician Frank Zappa, who eventually invited the senator to his home to see first-hand "what kind of toys" his children are playing with.

Hawkins was known during her tenure for saying and doing things many considered bizarre.  She was most infamous during her first year in office for hosting a luncheon in an ornate Senate dining room of New York sirloin steak, tossed salad, baked potatoes, fresh asparagus, hot apple pie, and fresh strawberries and other citrus in which she railed against the "truly greedy" and proposed mandatory jail time for food stamp cheaters.  Critics dubbed it the "steak and jail" luncheon.

Hawkins once again faced Bob Graham (then governor of Florida) on a statewide ballot when she campaigned for re-election to the Senate in 1986. She lost, 55 percent to 45 percent. This was the largest margin of defeat for an incumbent Senator in 1986.

Post-Washington
Hawkins returned to Winter Park in early 1987. She was United States representative to the Organization of American States' Inter-American Drug Abuse Control Commission (CICAD) for seven years before leaving active politics. She remained involved behind the scenes in central Florida and her endorsement was sought by many candidates. Hawkins was named a director of Philip Crosby Associates in 1988. She joined the board of Nu Skin Enterprises in 1997. She was a life-long member of the Church of Jesus Christ of Latter-day Saints.

Health
In a freak accident, a television studio partition toppled and struck her in early January 1982 during an interview at WESH-TV in Winter Park, Florida. While not life-threatening, the mishap aggravated a back injury she suffered years before in an automobile collision and caused constant pain which plagued her during her years in Washington. Senator Strom Thurmond, in his capacity as President pro tempore, gave her the use of a room in the Capitol building for a hospital bed where she found pain relief under weighted traction during breaks between congressional activities.

Hawkins' right side was paralyzed in 1998 as the result of a severe stroke.  After this, she used a wheelchair.  She stayed active, appearing on October 1, 2009, at the opening ceremony of the Waldorf Astoria Orlando at Walt Disney World.

She died on December 4, 2009, of complications from a fall she suffered the previous day.

Electoral history
1978 Florida Governor/Lt.Governor
Bob Graham/Wayne Mixson (D), 56%
Jack Eckerd/Paula Hawkins (R), 44%
1980 Florida U.S. Senate
Paula Hawkins (R), 51%
Bill Gunter (D), 49%
1986 Florida U.S. Senate
Bob Graham (D), 55%
Paula Hawkins (R), 45%

See also

Women in the United States Senate

References

External links

|-

1927 births
2009 deaths
20th-century American politicians
20th-century American women politicians
Accidental deaths from falls
Accidental deaths in Florida
Latter Day Saints from Georgia (U.S. state)
Florida Republicans
Female United States senators
Latter Day Saints from Utah
Politicians from Salt Lake City
People from Maitland, Florida
People from Winter Park, Florida
Politicians from Atlanta
Republican Party United States senators from Florida
Utah State University alumni
Women in Florida politics
Latter Day Saints from Florida
21st-century American women